The George Van Biesbroeck Prize is an award for long-term achievements in the field of astronomy. According to the American Astronomical Society awards website; "The Van Biesbroeck prize is normally awarded every two years and honors a living individual for long-term extraordinary or unselfish service to astronomy, often beyond the requirements of his or her paid position."

From 1979 to 1996 the award was presented by Van Biesbroeck Award, Inc. The American Astronomical Society assumed responsibility for the Prize in 1997.

The prize is named after George Van Biesbroeck who himself continued to work as an active astronomer for 27 years after "retirement" at age 65.

Previous winners
This list is from the American Astronomical Society website.

Awarded by Van Biesbroeck Award, Inc.

Awarded by American Astronomical Society

See also

 List of astronomy awards

References

Astronomy prizes
Awards established in 1979
American awards
American Astronomical Society